Loudovikos ton Anogeion is the performing name of George Dramountanis, a contemporary Greek musician and composer from Crete.

Biography 
George Dramountanis was born in the village of Anogeia, Crete.

References

External links 
Biography at the online music magazine MusicHeaven (in Greek)
Vikipedi biography of Loudovikos ton Anogeion (in Turkish)

Greek musicians
Greek singer-songwriters
Greek mandolin players
Singers from Crete
Cretan musicians

Living people
Year of birth missing (living people)
People from Anogeia